The Hotel Pasaje was a hotel located on Paseo del Prado between San José and Dragones, facing the National Capitol in Havana, Cuba.

History

Before the Havana walls were torn down, a partial map shows the site of the Villanueva railway (later the site of the National Capitol), and the site of the Pasaje hotel before the plots were subdivided.

Built in 1871, the Hotel Passage was the first building to be built in Cuba dedicated to the hotel industry.

Gallery

See also

 Hotel San Carlos, Havana
 Hotel Saratoga, Havana
 Royal Palm Hotel (Havana)
 Hotel Perla de Cuba, Havana
 Palacio de la Marquesa de Villalba, Havana
 El Capitolio

References

External links
 Demolición “a la cubana” en la Habana Vieja

Buildings and structures in Havana
Neoclassical architecture in Cuba
Architecture in Havana
History of Havana
Demolished buildings and structures in Cuba